Ohenewa Akuffo (born February 15, 1979 in York, Ontario, Canada) is an Olympic freestyle wrestler for Canada

Education

High School 
Ohenewa Akuffo attended Ascension Secondary School in Mississauga, Ontario. And later moved to Brampton where she wrestled for St. Augustine Secondary School.

University 

Akuffo graduated from York University in 2011 with a degree in Business with honors in Marketing and a Certificate of Management and Sports Administration.

Wrestling career 

Ohenewa Akuffo is a Brampton, Ontario native who competed in Olympic-style wrestling for 20 years. Throughout her career as a high-performance athlete, Ohenewa has represented Canada in several World Championships. She has traveled around the world for numerous competitions, has won many feats and was a presenter at the 2013 International Olympic Academy Young Participants' Session. Her notable achievements include:

      Commonwealth Games Gold medallist
       World Silver & Bronze medallist
      2009 Brampton Hall of Fame Inductee
       Canadian Olympian
       Two-time silver medallist at the Pan American Games
       Ten-time Senior National Champion

She won a bronze medal on 2008 FILA Wrestling World Championships.

Professional career 

Ohenewa Akuffo is a public speaker and life coach.

Personal life 

Akuffo is of Ghanaian descent.  Akuffo lived in Accra, Ghana (West Africa) from the ages of three to eight.

References

 COC Profile
 Profile

1979 births
Living people
Black Canadian sportswomen
Canadian female sport wrestlers
Canadian people of Ghanaian descent
Olympic wrestlers of Canada
Wrestlers at the 2003 Pan American Games
Wrestlers at the 2007 Pan American Games
Wrestlers at the 2008 Summer Olympics
Wrestlers at the 2010 Commonwealth Games
Wrestling people from Ontario
Commonwealth Games gold medallists for Canada
World Wrestling Championships medalists
Pan American Games silver medalists for Canada
Commonwealth Games medallists in wrestling
Pan American Games medalists in wrestling
Universiade medalists in wrestling
Universiade gold medalists for Canada
Medalists at the 2005 Summer Universiade
Medalists at the 2003 Pan American Games
Medalists at the 2007 Pan American Games
21st-century Canadian women
Medallists at the 2010 Commonwealth Games